Fred Welton Warmsley III (born September 22,1987), is an American record producer and sound artist from Sacramento, California. Initially known for his work with the New York City-based hip hop collective Pro Era, he has since been known for producing in multiple genres including breakcore, ambient and noise music, releasing eight extended plays and two long plays since 2013, including the critically acclaimed Alternate/Endings. His debut studio album under the name Dedekind Cut, although no at all related to Dedekind Music helped him capitalized his music and the entitled $uccessor, was released in November 2016.

Career

2010–2012: Early career and work with Pro Era
Warmsley, then known as Lee Bannon, first began to receive attention after self-releasing a number of homemade beat tapes from 2010 to 2012, eventually leading to collaborations with California rappers Souls of Mischief, Hieroglyphics and fellow producer The Alchemist. Soon after, Warmsley was introduced to Joey Bada$$ and the rest of Pro Era through a mutual friend. Bannon signed on as Pro Era's touring DJ in 2012 and doing production for Joey Badas$$' third mixtape Summer Knights. He appeared alongside Joey Bada$$ and The Roots when they performed "Waves" live on Late Night with Jimmy Fallon on November 2, 2012.

2013–2015: Alternate/Endings, Pattern of Excel and name change
After his time with Pro Era, Warmsley began to explore a more experimental sound as a solo artist. In June 2013, he self-released "NW/WB", which showcased strong jungle and drum and bass influences and garnered a significant amount of press, including Spin, who included Bannon on their list of the 5 Best New Artists for July 2013. The attention drew the interest of British label Ninja Tune, which signed Bannon in October 2013. His debut long play, entitled Alternate/Endings, was released on January 9, 2014 to critical acclaim. Rolling Stone placed Alternate/Endings at number 15 of its 20 Best Electronic and Dance Albums of 2014.

On April 27, 2015, Warmsley announced his second long play, Pattern of Excel, along with its first single "Artificial Stasis". It was also announced that the album would consist almost completely of ambient music. On May 26, 2015, Warmsley announced via a hand-written note posted on his Instagram page that he would be changing his moniker from Lee Bannon to "¬ b" (meaning "not Bannon"). He wrote that Pattern of Excel would be his final release as Lee Bannon, adding that he feels the name had "reached its limits" and that "the future can no longer exist in the same realm with music I created when I was 17, fickle and still developing." The following day, he released the track "disneμ girls" from Pattern of Excel, which was itself released on July 8, 2015.

2015–present: Second name change and $uccessor
On September 9, 2015, Warmsley released an extended play titled tHot eNhançeR under the new moniker "Dedekind Cut". He followed that up with a collaborative project with the musician Rabit titled R&D on January 19, 2016. On March 23, 2016 American Zen was released physically by Hospital Productions and digitally by Ninja Tune. In a review, Resident Advisor described American Zen as "new age" and having "chilling cinematic sound design". On September 1, 2016, it was announced that Warmsley would be releasing his debut studio album as Dedekind Cut, titled $uccessor, on November 11, 2016 on the NON Worldwide record label.

On January 15, 2018, Warmsley, under the alias of Barrio Sur, released बड़ा शोक (heart break), a rock-oriented mixtape that was previously recorded in the summer of 2017. The mixtape is dedicated to Chyna Gibson, a trans woman and performer of color from Sacramento, California who was shot dead in New Orleans, Louisiana during Mardi Gras.

Discography

As Lee Bannon
Studio albums
 Alternate/Endings (2013)
 Pattern of Excel (2015)

As Dedekind Cut
Studio albums
 $uccessor (2016)
 Tahoe (2018)

Extended plays
 tHot eNhançeR (2015)
 R&D  (2016)
 LAST (2016)
 American Zen (2016)
The Expanding Domain (2017)

As Barrio Sur
Mixtapes
 बड़ा शोक (heart break) (2018)

Production

The following is a list of albums in which Warmsley has produced as either producer or co-producer, showing year released, performing artists and album name.

References

External links

 Fred Warmsley at Bandcamp
 Fred Warmsley profile at Ninja Tune's official website

1987 births
Living people
Businesspeople from Sacramento, California
African-American record producers
Record producers from California
American electronic musicians
Ninja Tune artists
Plug Research artists
21st-century African-American people
20th-century African-American people